1st AFCA Awards

Best Film:
Crash

The 1st Austin Film Critics Association Awards honored the best in filmmaking for 2005.

Top 10 Films
 Crash
 The Squid and the Whale
 Sin City
 Munich
 Brokeback Mountain
 Hustle & Flow
 Capote
 Oldboy
 Syriana
 Good Night, and Good Luck.

Winners
 Best Film:
 Crash
 Best Director:
 Paul Haggis – Crash
 Best Actor:
 Philip Seymour Hoffman – Capote
 Best Actress:
 Reese Witherspoon – Walk the Line
 Best Supporting Actor:
 William Hurt – A History of Violence
 Best Supporting Actress:
 Laura Linney – The Squid and the Whale
 Best Original Screenplay:
 The Squid and the Whale – Noah Baumbach
 Best Adapted Screenplay:
 Brokeback Mountain – Larry McMurtry and Diana Ossana
 Best Foreign Language Film:
 Oldboy • South Korea
 Best Documentary:
 Murderball
 Best Animated Film:
 Sin City
 Breakthrough Artist Award:
 Terrence Howard – Crash and Hustle & Flow
 Most Promising Filmmaker:
 Noah Baumbach – The Squid and the Whale
 Austin Film Award:
 Sin City

References
 2005 Awards

External links
 IMDb page

2005 film awards
2005